Aaron Krickstein (born August 2, 1967), nicknamed "Marathon Man", is an American former professional tennis player who competed on the ATP Tour from 1983 to 1996. He currently competes on the Outback Champions Series Over-30 tour.

Krickstein reached his career high ATP ranking of World No. 6 on February 26, 1990. He achieved this ranking on the back of wins in Sydney and Los Angeles, as well as his best ever results at Wimbledon and the US Open. He is perhaps best known for his five-set, marathon loss to Jimmy Connors at the 1991 US Open, which ESPN called "an instant classic".

Personal life 
Krickstein was born in Ann Arbor, Michigan, the son of Evelyn, a stay-at-home mom, and Herb Krickstein, a pathologist.
His sister, Kathy, won the Big Ten tennis championship in 1978. He is the uncle of LPGA golfer Morgan Pressel, Kathy's daughter.

Krickstein is Jewish and in the early 1990s was one of three highly ranked Jewish-American tennis players, along with Jay Berger and Brad Gilbert.

Krickstein has been the director of tennis at St. Andrews Country Club in Boca Raton, Florida, since 2002.

Career

Junior 
Krickstein started playing tennis when he was six. He became an active competitor on the high school tennis scene during his teens, and still holds the Michigan record for most consecutive match wins at this level (56). He played for University Liggett School.

Krickstein won the American National Under 16 championship in 1982. While still only 16, he was the US National Junior Tennis Association Champion, Clay Champion, and USTA National Champion in the 18s in 1983. He won five consecutive junior championships.

Professional 
Krickstein set an ATP record for being the youngest player to win a singles title on the ATP Tour (at age 16, 2 months after his 16th birthday), in Tel Aviv. Krickstein set a record for being the youngest player to ever break the top 10 (at age 17).

In 1984, he won the U.S. Pro Tennis Championship, becoming its youngest winner, and a clay court tournament in Boston. In 1989 he won the Tokyo Indoor Tennis Tournament and a hard court tournament in Sydney, Australia. In 1991, 1992, and 1993 he won the South African Open.

Krickstein had an injury-plagued career, which included stress fractures in his feet, problems with his knees and wrists in 1985 and 1986, and injuries suffered when he was hurt in a car accident in 1987.

His best finishes in a Grand Slam event were at the 1989 US Open, and at the 1995 Australian Open, where he reached the semi finals.

Krickstein is perhaps best remembered for his famous five-set match against Jimmy Connors on Labor Day at the 1991 US Open. Krickstein had led the match 2–1 in sets and was ahead 5–2 in the fifth set, before losing the match in a tiebreaker. The match lasted four hours and 41 minutes. According to ESPN, "The match was an instant classic." Before retractable roofs were constructed for use at the US Open, this match was the default television filler during tournament rain delays; because of this, it is probably the most viewed tennis match of all time. For about 24 years after the match, Krickstein and Connors only spoke a few words to each other. But in 2014, Krickstein called Connors to invite him to play a "reunion match" for members at the Florida country club where Krickstein was (and still is) the tennis director. They played in February 2015 and Krickstein won a pro set 8–5.

He had a record of 10 career wins from 0–2 set deficits. His nickname "Marathon Man" was a reference to his ability to make a comeback when behind in a match. Krickstein won 27 of his 35 career matches that went into a fifth set.

Krickstein defeated a number of top players, including Ivan Lendl (world #1) in 1990, Michael Stich (world #2 and #4) in 1994 and 1991, Stefan Edberg (world #3) in 1988 at the US Open, Boris Becker (world #3) in 1992, Mats Wilander (world #4) in 1984, Jimmy Arias (world #5) in 1984, and Sergi Bruguera (world #5) in 1994. He won against Pete Sampras and Andre Agassi.

Davis Cup 
Krickstein was a member of the United States Davis Cup team from 1985 to 1987, and also was a member of the 1990 squad. He compiled a 6–4 record in singles play during Davis Cup ties. The highlight of Krickstein's Davis Cup career came in 1990 when he scored two, hard-fought victories in a World Group Quarterfinal tie against Czechoslovakia, leading his team to a 4–1 win.

ATP career finals

Singles: 19 (9 titles, 10 runner-ups)

Performance timeline

Singles

Records 
 These records were attained in the Open Era of tennis.

See also 
 List of select Jewish tennis players

References

External links 
 
 
 
 Outback Champions Series bio
 Jews in Sports bio

American male tennis players
Jewish American sportspeople
Jewish tennis players
Sportspeople from Ann Arbor, Michigan
People from Grosse Pointe, Michigan
Tennis people from Michigan
Living people
1967 births
21st-century American Jews